Namazipur is a village in Shahkot in Jalandhar district of Punjab State, India. The village is administrated by a sarpanch who is an elected representative of village as per Panchayati raj (India).

Population
According to 2011 census report  Namazipur has 69 households with the total population of 402 persons of which 200 are male and 202 are female. The total population of children in the age group 0-6 is 27.

Transport 
Shahkot Malisian station is the nearest train station.

References 

Villages in Jalandhar district